The Portrait of Andrea Doria is a painting finished circa 1526 by the Italian High Renaissance painter Sebastiano Del Piombo. It is housed in the Doria Pamphilj Gallery of Rome.

Paintings by Sebastiano del Piombo
1526 paintings
Paintings in Rome
Collections of the Doria Pamphilj Gallery